The Turukkaeans were a Bronze and Iron Age people of Mesopotamia and the Zagros Mountains, in South West Asia.  Their endonym has sometimes been reconstructed as Tukri.

History

Middle Bronze
Turukku was regarded by the Old Assyrian Empire as a constant threat, during the reign of Shamshi-Adad I (1813-1782 BCE) and his son and successor Ishme-Dagan (1781-1750 BCE). The Turukkaeans were reported to have sacked the city of Mardaman around the year 1769/68 BCE. Babylon's defeat of Turukku was celebrated in the 37th year of Hammurabi's reign (c. 1773 BCE).

A significant early reference to them is an inscription by the Babylonian king Hammurabi, (r. circa 1792 – c. 1752 BCE) that mentions a kingdom named Tukriš (UET I l. 46, iii–iv, 1–4), alongside Gutium, Subartu and another name that is usually reconstructed as Elam. Other texts from the same period refer to the kingdom as Tukru.

Iron Age
By the early part of the 1st millennium BCE, names such as Turukkum, Turukku and ti-ru-ki-i are being used for the same region. In a broader sense, names such as Turukkaean been used in a generic sense to mean "mountain people" or "highlanders".

Tukru or  Turukkum was said to have spanned the north-east edge of Mesopotamia and an adjoining part of the Zagros Mountains (modern Iraq and Iran). In particular, they were associated with the Lake Urmia basin and the valleys of the north-west Zagros.  They were therefore located north of ancient Lullubi, and at least one Neo-Assyrian (9th to 7th centuries BCE) text refers to the whole area and its peoples as "Lullubi-Turukki" (VAT 8006).

Hurrians?
In terms of cultural and linguistic characteristics, little is known about the Tukri. They are described by their contemporaries as a semi-nomadic, mountain tribe, who wore animal skins. Some scholars believe they may have been Hurrian-speaking or subject to a Hurrian elite.

See also
Gutian dynasty of Sumer
Sumerian King List
Gutian language

Footnotes

Bibliography
German Archaeological Institute. Department of Tehran Archaeological releases from Iran, Volume 19, Dietrich Reimer, 1986 
 Wayne Horowitz, Mesopotamian Cosmic Geography. Winona Lake; Eisenbrauns, 1998.
Jesper Eidem, Jørgen Læssøe, The Shemshara archives, Volume 23. Copenhagen, Royal Danish Academy of Sciences and Letters, 2001. 
Jörgen Laessøe, The Shemshāra Tablets. Copenhagen, 1959.
Jörgen Laessøe, "The Quest for the Country of *Utûm", Journal of the American Oriental Society, 1968, vol. 88 , no. 1, pp. 120–122.
Victor Harold Matthews, Pastoral nomadism in the Mari Kingdom (ca. 1830-1760 B.C.). American Schools of Oriental Research, 1978. 
 Peter Pfälzner, Keilschrifttafeln von Bassetki lüften Geheimnis um Königsstadt Mardaman (webpage; German language), University of Tubingen, 2018.
 Daniel T. Potts, Nomadism in Iran: From Antiquity to the Modern Era. Oxford; Oxford University Press, 2014.
Ancient peoples of the Near East
Ancient history of Iran
States and territories established in the 2nd millennium BC
States and territories disestablished in the 1st millennium BC
Ancient Mesopotamia
History of Mesopotamia